Henri Fouquet (31 July 1727 – 10 October 1806) was an 18th-century French physician.

A military physician, inspector of the army of the Pyrénées-Orientales, he held the first Chair of internal clinic of Montpellier from 1794 to 1803.

He collaborated with the Dictionnaire raisonné des sciences, des arts et des métiers, was a member of the Institut de France and chevalier of the Légion d'honneur (decree dated 17 July 1804).

In 1800 he went to Andalusia to analyze the variations of the pulse based on various conditions and provided graphical representations of these conditions.

Works 
 Wetsh, with inset comments by Henri Fouquet, Medicina ex pulsu, sive systema doctrinae sphygmicae, Vindobonae, 1770.
 Discours sur la Clinique, Montpellier, at G. Izar and A. Ricard, Imprimeurs de l’École de Médecine, .

References

Sources 
  Charles-Louis Dumas, Éloge de M. Fouquet. In : Bulletin de la Société libre des sciences et belles-lettres de Montpellier, Montpellier, Tournel, 1809 (supplément au n° XXXVII)

External links 
 Les articles d'Henri Fouquet dans l'Encyclopédie on Persée
 Recherche sur l’histoire du rêve.

18th-century French physicians
Contributors to the Encyclopédie (1751–1772)
Chevaliers of the Légion d'honneur
Physicians from Montpellier
1727 births
1806 deaths